Pyatkov Log is a rural locality (a selo) and the administrative center of Pyatkovlogovsky Selsoviet of Volchikhinsky District, Altai Krai, Russia. The population was 350 as of 2016. It was founded in 1920. There are 2 streets.

Geography 
Pyatkov Log is located 39 km north of Volchikha (the district's administrative centre) by road. Komintern is the nearest rural locality.

Ethnicity 
The village is inhabited by Ukrainians and others.

References 

Rural localities in Volchikhinsky District